Get Out is a 2017 American horror film directed by Jordan Peele. The screenplay, also written by Peele, is a critique of racism hidden in the United States. The film stars Daniel Kaluuya as a black man who visits the family of his white girlfriend (Allison Williams), who kidnap and brainwash African-Americans into servitude. Bradley Whitford, Caleb Landry Jones, Stephen Root, Lakeith Stanfield, and Catherine Keener co-star.

The film premiered at the Sundance Film Festival on January 24, 2017. Universal Pictures released it theatrically on February 24. The film was a commercial success, grossing $255 million worldwide on a $4.5 million budget. Rotten Tomatoes, a review aggregator, surveyed 304 and judged 99% to be positive.

Get Out garnered awards and nominations in a variety of categories with particular praise for its screenplay, direction, and Kaluuya's performance. At the 20th British Independent Film Awards, it won Best Foreign Independent Film. Kaluuya won Best Actor at the 38th Boston Society of Film Critics Awards. The film was nominated for two Golden Globe Awards.

Accolades

See also
 2017 in film

Notes

References

External links
 

Lists of accolades by film
Horror film lists